The Whole World's Dancing is the sixth studio album by American soul-disco group, The Trammps, released in 1979 through Atlantic Records.

Commercial performance
The album peaked at No. 184 on the Billboard 200. The album features the single "Soul Bones", which peaked at No. 91 on the Hot Soul Singles chart.

Track listing

Personnel
The Trammps
Earl Young
Harold Wade 
Stanley Wade 
Robert Upchurch 
Jimmy Ellis

Additional Personnel
Norman Harris, T.J. Tindall, Bobby Eli, Harold Wade, Charles Ellerbee, Larry Washington, Carlton Kent, Ron "Have Mercy" Kersey, Bruce Gray, Eugene Curry, Ronald Baker, Earl Young, James Walker, Keith Benson, Jimmy Williams, Mikki Farrow – rhythm section
Barbara Ingram, Evette Benton, Carla Benson – background vocals
Artie Williams, Harold Watkins, Rueben Henderson – horn section
Don Renaldo and His Strings and Horns (except on "Soul Bones" horns by Paul Schorr & His Strings and Maurice Spears & His Horns)
Stevie Wonder – harmonica on "Soul Bones

Charts
Album

Singles

References

External links

1979 albums
The Trammps albums
Albums produced by Norman Harris
Albums recorded at Sigma Sound Studios
Albums recorded at Total Experience Recording Studios
Atlantic Records albums